Living Death was a German speed metal/thrash metal band from Velbert, noted for being one of the pioneering bands in the thrash metal genre. The band's career spanned from the early 1980s until the early 1990s and has since acquired a cult status.

History
Living Death was formed in 1981 in Velbert, North Rhine-Westphalia, by Reiner and Dieter Kelch, and Frank Fricke, starting out as a simple heavy metal band. In 1981, drummer Frank Schubring and vocalist Thorsten "Toto" Bergmann joined. A year later, they recorded their self-titled demo, resulting in a deal with Earthshaker in 1983. Later that year, Frank Schubring left the band and was replaced by Harald Lutze.

In 1984, Living Death released their debut album Vengeance of Hell, which, despite poor production quality, sold well in all independent charts. Living Death then went on tour in support of Warlock; after which they fired drummer Harald Lutze and replaced him with Andreas Overhoff. In January 1985, they released the EP Watch-Out! with three remixed songs from the first LP and the self-titled track. In August, Metal Revolution was released. Due to its cult status, the album was re-issued in 2002 by Shark Records. A year later, the band signed a deal with Aaarrg Records and the EP Back to the Weapons was recorded; shortly before its release, they found a new drummer, Atomic Steif. In 1987, the album Protected from Reality was released, followed by 1988's Live EP, featuring four songs off their second album.

After the release of their fourth studio album Worlds Neuroses in 1989, band members Toto, Fred and Atomic Steif left the band (and recorded one EP as Sacred Chao, taking the name from a song on Worlds Neuroses). The remaining Living Death members then recruited vocalist Gerald Thelen and drummer Frank Ullrich as replacements. With this line-up, Living Death split up in 1992, having released Killing in Action a year prior.

Previous members

Last-known lineup
Thorsten "Toto" Bergmann (singer)
Andreas Oberhoff (drummer)
Reiner Kelch (guitar)
Dieter Kelch (bass)

Vocals:
Thorsten "Toto" Bergmann (1981–1989) (Sacred Chao, X-Mas Project)
Gerald Thelen (1989–1991)
Guitars:
Frank 'Fred' Fricke (1980–1989) (Mekong Delta, X-Mas Project, Sacred Chao, ex-U.D.O.)

Drums:
Frank Schubring (1981–1983)
Eric (session drums on Vengeance of Hell)
Harald Lutze (1984)
Andreas Oberhoff (1984–1986, died 2021)
Atomic Steif (1986–1989) (Stahlträger, Assassin, Sodom, Holy Moses, Violent Force, Sacred Chao)

Discography

Studio albums
Vengeance of Hell (1984)
Metal Revolution (1985)
Protected from Reality (1987)
Worlds Neuroses (1989)
Killing in Action (1991)

EPs
Watch Out! (1985)
Back to the Weapons (1986)
Live (1988)

Compilation albums
Living Death (1994)

Singles
Eisbein (mit Sauerkraut) (1987)

Demos
Demo 83 (1983)
Pre-Production Demo (1984)

References

External links 
 
 

German thrash metal musical groups
German heavy metal musical groups